Softball competition at the 2022 Bolivarian Games in Valledupar, Colombia were held from 25 to 30 June 2022 at the Estadio Dorismel Pacheco Fontalvo.

The women's tournament was the only event scheduled to be contested. A total of 105 athletes (15 per team) competed in the event. The tournament was an open competition without age restrictions.

Venezuela were the women's softbol competition defending champions having won it in the previous edition in Santa Marta 2017, but they were unable to retain their title after finishing fourth. Dominican Republic won the gold medal by beating Colombia 12–3 in the final. Peru took third place to win the bronze medal.

Participating nations
A total of 7 nations (5 ODEBO nations and 2 invited) registered teams for the softbol event.

Venue
All matches will be played at Estadio Dorismel Pacheco Fontalvo located within the Centro de Alto Rendimiento Deportivo La Gota Fría in Valledupar, The Estadio Dorismel Pacheco Fontalvo has a capacity for 1,600 spectators.

Medal summary

Medal table

Medalists

Women's tournament

The tournament consisted of a preliminary round (or group stage) and a final round.

All match times are in COT (UTC−5).

Preliminary round
The preliminary round consisted of a single group of 7 teams in which each team will play once against the other 6 teams in the group on a round-robin format, with the top four teams advancing to the semi-finals play-offs in the final round.

Final round
The final round was played under the page playoff system in which the top two teams from the preliminary round played a semi-final game, with the winners advancing directly to the gold medal game. The third and fourth placed teams from the preliminary round played another semi-final game with the winners advancing to the bronze medal game against the losers of the first semi-final. The losers of the bronze medal game kept the bronze medal while the winners advanced to the gold medal game against the winners of the first semi-final.

Semi-finals

Bronze medal game

Gold medal game

References

External links
Bolivarianos Valledupar 2022 Softball

2022 Bolivarian Games
Bolivarian Games
2022 Bolivarian Games